An andén (plural andenes), Spanish for "platform", is a stair-step like terrace dug into the slope of a hillside for agricultural purposes. The term is most often used to refer to the terraces built by pre-Columbian cultures in the Andes mountains of South America. Andenes had several functions, the most important of which was to increase the amount of cultivatable land available to farmers by leveling a planting area for crops.  The best known andenes are in Peru, especially in the Sacred Valley near the Inca capital of Cuzco and in the Colca Canyon. Many andenes have survived for more than 500 years and are still in use by farmers throughout the region.

The benefits of andenes include utilizing steep slopes for agriculture, reducing the threat of freezes, increasing exposure to sunshine, controlling erosion, improving absorption of water, and aerating the soil. The construction and use of andenes for crops enabled agriculture in the Andes to expand into climatically marginal areas of low or seasonal rainfall, low temperatures, and thin soils.

Origin and history 

Agricultural terraces have been built and used by farmers around the world for thousands of years, mainly for the purpose of permitting cultivation on steep hillsides. The origin of terraces or andenes in the Andes is poorly understood, but they were being built by 2000 BCE. Agriculture became essential for the subsistence of a growing population after 900 BCE. People of the Huarpa culture and the later Wari culture (500–1000 CE) built terraces into the hillsides of the Andes in Peru. During the Inca Empire (1438–1533 CE) the technology and the quantity of land devoted to andenes reached their highest levels.

The Spanish conquest of Peru in 1533 led to a demographic collapse in the Andes, as the Indigenous population precipitously declined due to European diseases and war. With lessened population pressure, many farmers relocated or were relocated by force in accordance with the Spanish policy of reductions to flatter and more easily cultivated lands. Also, the Spanish introduced oxen and horses as draft animals and plows. Andenes were difficult to access by these innovations, being most suitable for the hand tiller.  In the 19th century with population growth, a number of andenes came back into use, but in the late 20th century 60 to 80 percent of andenes had been abandoned for growing crops, although they may be used for grazing.

Engineering 

Andenes were complicated to build, requiring provisions for drainage and irrigation. The result was a terrace providing "well-drained rich soil and a level surface for growing crops." At prestigious or royal sites, such as Machu Picchu, finely cut stone was used as the outer (visible) face of the retaining wall.

The rock and sand layers were to aid drainage of excessive precipitation and were especially important in areas with abundant rainfall. At Machu Picchu, surface drains conveyed excess water to a main drain which supplied water to fountains and a domestic water supply canal.  In arid areas, such as the Colca Valley, where Andenes are still cultivated, water for irrigation is brought down from the snow melt of high peaks and springs via a complex system of canals and reservoirs.  Irrigation water is released from a reservoir onto the top-most andén and the overflow irrigates the lower andenes. If irrigation water is inadequate, agriculture on the lower andenes will fail. As strategies of risk management, farmers in the present day – and probably in pre-Columbian times – have up to 30 plots of land at different locations and grow a wide variety of crops.

Micro-climate modification 

In the steep terrain of the Andes, flat and good farming land was scarce. The adverse climate in much of the Andes was another negative factor for agriculture, which the use of andenes helped overcome.

The stone retaining walls of andenes absorbed the sun's heat during the day and radiated it at night, warming the soil and preventing damage to frost-sensitive crops such as maize. Maize was a prestige crop for the Incas and earlier cultures, but of the crops cultivated in the Andes, it is the most demanding of water and nutrients.

Rehabilitation 

Efforts to rehabilitate and bring andenes back into production near Cuzco began in the 1970s. In 2014, the Peruvian Ministry of Agriculture and the Inter-American Development Bank began a project to rehabilitate andenes, including those near Laraos in the Lima region.

Notable collections of andenes 
 
The andenes possess an appeal beyond the historical and their original economic motivations: they are also landscape resources whose situation in the Andes Mountains has notable aesthetic value.  Many of them follow the natural curve of the slopes in such a way that preserves the visual harmony of the environment. The idea of hanging gardens in the mountains can fit well with the description of the Andenes.

At the Salinas de Maras near Cuzco, andenes are used to create 3,000 salt pans to evaporate salt. The andenes and salt industry are believed to date to pre-Incaic (before 1430 CE) times. A distinctive pink-hued salt is still being produced in the 21st century.
    
 Between central Peru and northern Bolivia are found the best conserved collection of andenes. Perhaps the most impressive Andenes zone is the Colca Canyon (Valle de Colca), whose terraces were constructed by the Collaguas beginning in the 11th century. Those on the islands in Lake Titicaca (constructed by the Aymara) are visually stunning, as are those in the so-called Sacred Valley of the Incas (Valle Sagrado de los Incas) in Cusco, those constructed by the Incas in Moray (Inca ruin) in a collection of concentric circles, as well as the enormous terraces at Pisaq and Ollantaytambo.

See also 
Agriculture
Incan agriculture
Terrace (agriculture)

Notes

References

Bibliography 

Agriculture in Peru
Agricultural terraces
Geography of Peru
History of agriculture
Agricultural terminology

de:Terrasse (Landwirtschaft)